"Sober" is the first single from American recording artist Childish Gambino's 2014 EP Kauai.

Music video
The song's music video features Donald Glover dancing in a take-out restaurant while intoxicated, trying to impress a woman (Amber-Lauren Jones) waiting for her food. It explores themes similar to Michael Jackson's "The Way You Make Me Feel" music video, but with a different outcome. On March 21, 2015, "Sober" won the mtvU Woodies Award for Best Video Woodie. , "Sober" has accumulated over 110 million views on YouTube.

Charts

Weekly charts

Year-end charts

Certifications

References

External links

2014 singles
Donald Glover songs
Songs written by Ludwig Göransson
Songs written by Donald Glover
2013 songs
Glassnote Records singles
Songs about drugs